This is a list of post-nominal letters used in Canada. The order in which they follow an individual's name is:

 Distinctions conferred directly by the Crown
 University degrees
 Memberships of societies and other distinctions

Normally no more than two are given, representing the highest award of each type. For decorations and medals, the order of precedence is the same as the order of precedence for the wearing of order insignias, decorations, and medals, as laid out by the Department of Canadian Heritage.

Awards and orders

Professional and academic qualifications

Hereditary titles

British post-nominals used alongside Canadian ones
Any person who, prior to 1 June 1972, was a member of a British order or the recipient of a British decoration or medal may use the post-nominal letters for the decoration or medal together with those of any Canadian order, decoration or medal.

Canadians can still be awarded British medals, as well as those from other countries, but this must first be approved by the Government of Canada. (See Nickle Resolution)

The Most Venerable Order of the Hospital of St. John of Jerusalem

See also
 Orders, decorations, and medals of Canada
 Canadian honorifics

Notes and references

Orders, decorations, and medals of Canada
Canada-related lists
Canada